The 2011–12 season was Middlesbrough's third consecutive season in the Championship. They also competed in the FA Cup and the League Cup.

Results and fixtures

Pre-season

Note: Results are given with Middlesbrough score listed first. Man of the Match is according to mfc.co.uk.

Championship

League table

Results summary

Results by matchday

Matches

FA Cup

League Cup

Players

Captains

First-team squad

|-
|colspan="14"|Players featured for club who have been sent out on loan:
|-
|colspan="14"|Players featured for club who have left:

|}

Disciplinary record

Suspensions served

Key:
(H) = League Home, (A) = League Away, (FA) = FA Cup, (CC) = League Cup

Top scorers

Penalties

Assists

Contracts

|-

|-

Transfers

Summer

Players in 

Players out

Honours

 Individual
 Football League Championship Manager of the Month:
 September – Tony Mowbray (Won)
 December – Tony Mowbray (Won)
 Football League Championship Player of the Month:
 August – Marvin Emnes (Won)
 September – Matthew Bates (Won)
 December – Nicky Bailey (Nominated)
 Middlesbrough Official Supporters Club Player of the Year:
 Barry Robson
 Middlesbrough Official Supporters Club Young Player of the Year:
 Jason Steele

Notes and references

Middlesbrough F.C. seasons
Middlesbrough